Igor Borisovich Dmitriev (29 May 1927 – 26 January 2008) was a Soviet and Russian film and theatre actor who specialized in playing aristocratic characters in costume productions (e.g., Rosencrantz in Grigori Kozintsev's Hamlet).

Igor Dmitriev was born in Leningrad to parents Boris Petrovich Dmitriev, a professional yachtsman and Elena Tauber, a ballerina. In 1948 he graduated from the Studio of the Moscow Art Theatre and in 1949 became an actor of the Vera Komissarzhevskaya Theater of Drama in Leningrad. From 1967 to 1984 he worked at Lenfilm. In 1984 he started working at the Nikolay Akimov Theater of Comedy. Dmitriev worked with Georgi Tovstonogov, Sergei Gerasimov, Yan Frid. He acted in more than 120 films, not only in the Soviet Union, but also in Hungary, Poland, East Germany, the United States, Morocco and Algeria.

He became People's Artist of the RSFSR in 1988. In 2000 he played the benefit performance in the play of George Bernard Shaw and Jerome Kilty Dear Liar: A Comedy of Letters. He also worked as a radio narrator, being one of the first actors to do so, he recited the novels of Leo Tolstoy, Theodore Dreiser, Guy de Maupassant, Émile Zola, Anton Chekhov and many others.

Selected filmography

 Ivan Pavlov (1950) as student
 She Loves You (1956) as Anatoly Pylnikov
 And Quiet Flows the Don (1957–1958) as Evgeny Listnitsky
 In the Days of October (1958) as Alexander Blok
 Under the Knock of the Wheels (1958) as Vasily Kovalsky
 Virgin Soil Upturned (1960)  as Lyatyevsky
 Black Gull (1962) as wounded
 Kain XVIII (1963) as General
 Hamlet (Гамлет, 1964) as Rosencrantz
 Speckle (1965) as Igor Borisovich
 Green Coach (1967) as Nikolai Osipovich Dyur
 Nikolay Bauman (1967) as Vasily Kachalov
 No Password Needed (1967) as  lieutenant Mordvinov
 An Old, Old Tale (1968) as prince
 Lyubov Yarovaya (1970) as Elysatov
 Franz Liszt. Dreams of love  (1970) as  prince Nikolay Petrovich Wittgenstein 
   Dauria  (1971) as esaul Solomonov
 Goya or the Hard Way to Enlightenment (1972) as Duke of Alba
 Farewell to St. Petersburg (1972) as Grand Duke Konstantin
 The Captivating Star of Happiness (1975) as Ludwig Lebsteltern
 Trust (1976) as Vladimir Bonch-Bruyevich
 The Blue Bird (1976) as Pleasure to Beloved Himself
 Golden Mine (1977) as Dr. Podneix
 The Dog in the Manger (1978) as Count Federico
 A Glass of Water (1979) as Marquis de Torcy
 Die Fledermaus (1979) as Frank, director of the prison
 Sherlock Holmes and Dr. Watson (1979) as Inspector Gregson
 The Suicide Club, or the Adventures of a Titled Person (1981) as Colonel Geraldine
 The Pokrovsky Gate (1982) as Gleb Orlovich
 Return from Orbit (1983) as Kuznetsov's fellow traveler on the train
 Crazy Day of Engineer Barkasov (1983) as Krutetsky
  Anna Pavlova (1983-1986) as Léon Bakst
 The Hobbit (1985) as  Gollum 
The Mountains are Smoking (1988) as Baron von Steinberg
 A Bright Personality (1989) as Bernardov
 Cyrano de Bergerac (1989) as Monflery
 Musketeers Twenty Years After (1992) as François de Vendôme, Duc de Beaufort
 Beautiful Stranger (1992)  as retired military
 Tartuffe (1992) as Cleanthes
 Streets of Broken Lights (1999) as director
 Give Me Moonlight (2001) as Eduard Sorokin

External links
  Biography
  Biography
  Obituary
 
 

Dmitriev, Igor Borisovich
Dmitriev, Igor Borisovich
Dmitriev, Igor Borisovich
Dmitriev, Igor Borisovich
Dmitriev, Igor Borisovich
Male actors from Saint Petersburg
Dmitriev, Igor Borisovich
Dmitriev, Igor Borisovich
Recipients of the Order of Honour (Russia)
Honored Artists of the RSFSR
Recipients of the Order "For Merit to the Fatherland", 4th class
Moscow Art Theatre School alumni
Burials at Serafimovskoe Cemetery